Vehicle registration tax (VRT) is a tax that is chargeable on registration of a motor vehicle in Ireland.

Every motor vehicle brought into the country, other than temporarily by a visitor, must be registered with Revenue and must have VRT paid for it by the end of 30 days of arrival in the country.

The tax is paid to the Revenue in two ways:

VRT is included in the retail price of a new motor vehicle purchased from a dealership
The tax is paid by the owner of a motor vehicle imported from abroad upon applying for registration (subject to exemptions, below).

The vehicle must be presented at a National Car Test centre within 30 days of importation into Ireland.

Calculation

VRT is calculated as a percentage of the open market selling price (OMSP) of the vehicle. The OMSP is the "expected retail price" and includes all taxes (Including VAT) previously paid in the state.

VRT rates pre-July 2008

Current VRT rates

A new system was introduced with effect from 1 July 2008.  This system moved the VRT calculation for passenger vehicles from being calculated on engine capacity to a system calculated on CO2 emissions. This system applies to new vehicles registered from this date as well as second hand vehicles (originally registered after this date) imported after this date. Commercial Vehicles remain unaffected. The rates have been updated however as of 1 January 2013.

VRT rates as of 1 January 2013

VRT rates before January 2013

In addition, motor tax rates have been realigned to reflect these new VRT bands with the motor tax payable being linked to the VRT band.

References

External links
Revenue Commissioners VRT
VRT Calculator for Second Hand Vehicles
Independent VRT site and discussion forum

Taxation in the Republic of Ireland
Vehicle taxes